Grab  (Hrab) is a village in the administrative district of Gmina Krempna, within Jasło County, Subcarpathian Voivodeship, in south-eastern Poland, close to the border with Slovakia.

Prior to Operation Vistula it was largely inhabited by Lemkos.

Two World War I cemeteries are located in the village.

References

Grab